Edward Colston Marshall (June 29, 1821 – July 9, 1893) was an American politician who served as congressman from California's at-large district from 1851 to 1853, and as California attorney general from 1883 to 1887. He was a member of the Democratic Party.

Early life and career 
Edward Colston Marshall was born in Woodford County, Kentucky on June 29, 1821. He attended Centre College in Danville, Kentucky and graduated from Transylvania University, Lexington, Kentucky. He later attended Washington College (now Washington and Lee University), where he studied law. He was admitted to the bar and moved to San Francisco, California and later to Sonora, California where he practiced law.

Military career 
Marshall served in the Mexican-American War.

Congress 
He was elected as a Democrat to the Thirty-second Congress (March 4, 1851 – March 3, 1853); was renominated in 1852, but withdrew before the election.

Later career 
He then settled in Marysville, Calif., and again engaged in the practice of law. He was an unsuccessful candidate for election to the United States Senate in 1856. He moved back to Kentucky and devoted himself to legal pursuits for the next twenty-one years. He eventually returned to San Francisco in 1877 and continued the practice of law. In 1882, he was elected attorney general of California, serving in that role from 1883 to 1886.

Death
He died in San Francisco on July 9, 1893 and was interred in Mountain View Cemetery in Oakland, California.

External links

1821 births
1893 deaths
California Attorneys General
Democratic Party members of the United States House of Representatives from California
People from Woodford County, Kentucky
19th-century American politicians